

Events and publications

Year overall

January
 January 24: Milton Caniff's Male Call makes its debut. It will run until 3 March 1946.
Action Comics (1938 series) #56 - DC Comics
Adventure Comics (1938 series) #82 - DC Comics
Air Fighters Comics (1941 series) #4 - Hillman Periodicals
All-American Comics (1939 series) #46 - DC Comics
All-Flash (1941 series) #8, previously quarterly - DC Comics
 All-Winners Comics (1941 series) #7 - Timely Comics
 Captain America Comics (1941 series) #22 - Timely Comics
 Crack Comics (1940 series) #27 marks the debut of Captain Triumph. - Quality Comics
Detective Comics (1937 series) #71 - DC Comics
Flash Comics (1940 series) #37 - DC Comics
 Human Torch Comics (1940 series) #10 - Timely Comics
 Marvel Mystery Comics (1939 series) #39 - Timely Comics
More Fun Comics (1936 series) #87 - DC Comics
Sensation Comics (1942 series) #13 - DC Comics
Star Spangled Comics (1941 series) #16 - DC Comics
Superman (1939 series) #20 - DC Comics
Young Allies Comics (1941 series) #6 - Timely Comics

February
 February 19: Hergé's Tintin story Red Rackham's Treasure is prepublished in Le Soir.
 Edgar P. Jacobs draws Le Rayon U in Bravo magazine, which is the first Belgian science fiction comic. 
Action Comics (1938 series) #57 - DC Comics
Adventure Comics (1938 series) #83 - DC Comics
Air Fighters Comics (1941 series) #5 - Hillman Periodicals
All-American Comics (1939 series) #47 - DC Comics
All-Star Comics (1940 series) #15 - DC Comics
Batman (1940 series) #15 - DC Comics
 Captain America Comics (1941 series) #23 - Timely Comics
Detective Comics (1937 series) #72 - DC Comics
Flash Comics (1940 series) #38 - DC Comics
 Marvel Mystery Comics (1939 series) #40 - Timely Comics
More Fun Comics (1936 series) #88 - DC Comics
Sensation Comics (1942 series) #14 - DC Comics
Star Spangled Comics (1941 series) #17 - DC Comics
 U.S.A. Comics (1941 series) #7 - Timely Comics

March
 March 4–5: Halfway the Tintin story Red Rackham's Treasure Professor Calculus makes his debut.
Action Comics (1938 series) #58 - DC Comics
Adventure Comics (1938 series) #84 - DC Comics
Air Fighters Comics (1941 series) #6 - Hillman Periodicals
All-American Comics (1939 series) #48 - DC Comics
All-Flash (1941 series) #9, previously quarterly - DC Comics
 Captain America Comics (1941 series) #24 - Timely Comics
Crack Comics (1940 series) #28 - Quality Comics
Detective Comics (1937 series) #73 - DC Comics
Flash Comics (1940 series) #39 - DC Comics
 Marvel Mystery Comics (1939 series) #41 - Timely Comics
More Fun Comics (1936 series) #89 - DC Comics
Sensation Comics (1942 series) #15 - DC Comics
Star Spangled Comics (1941 series) #18 - DC Comics
Superman (1939 series) #21 - DC Comics

Spring Issue

 World's Finest Comics (1941 series) #9 - DC Comics

April
 René Bonnet's comic strip Fripounet debuts in the magazine Lettres aux Jeunes. The boy character Fripounet will receive a female friend in 1945, named Marisette.
Action Comics (1938 series) #59 - DC Comics
Adventure Comics (1938 series) #85 - DC Comics
Air Fighters Comics (1941 series) #7 - Hillman Periodicals
All-American Comics (1939 series) #49 - DC Comics
All-Star Comics (1940 series) #16 - DC Comics
 All-Winners Comics (1941 series) #8 - Timely Comics
 Batman (1940 series) #16: marks the debut of Batman's faithful butler Alfred Pennyworth. - DC Comics
 Captain America Comics (1941 series) #25 - Timely Comics
Detective Comics (1937 series) #74 - DC Comics
Flash Comics (1940 series) #40 - DC Comics
 Human Torch Comics (1940 series) #11 - Timely Comics
 Marvel Mystery Comics (1939 series) #42 - Timely Comics
More Fun Comics (1936 series) #90 - DC Comics
Sensation Comics (1942 series) #16 - DC Comics
Star Spangled Comics (1941 series) #19 - DC Comics
 Sub-Mariner Comics (1941 series) #9 - Timely Comics
 U.S.A. Comics (1941 series) #8 - Timely Comics
Young Allies Comics (1941 series) #7 - Timely Comics

May
 May 10: Jack Sparling's Claire Voyant makes its debut. It will run until 1948.
 May 16: The final issue of the Italian comics magazine L'Avventuroso is published.
Action Comics (1938 series) #60 - DC Comics
Air Fighters Comics (1941 series) #8 - Hillman Periodicals
All-Flash (1941 series) #10, previously quarterly - DC Comics
 Captain America Comics (1941 series) #26 - Timely Comics
Crack Comics (1940 series) #29 - Quality Comics
Detective Comics (1937 series) #75 - DC Comics
Flash Comics (1940 series) #41 - DC Comics
 Marvel Mystery Comics (1939 series) #43 - Timely Comics
More Fun Comics (1936 series) #91 - DC Comics
Sensation Comics (1942 series) #17 - DC Comics
Star Spangled Comics (1941 series) #20 - DC Comics
Superman (1939 series) #22 - DC Comics

June
 June 20: Harry Haenigsen's Penny makes its debut. It will run until 1970. 
Action Comics (1938 series) #61 - DC Comics
Adventure Comics (1938 series) #86 - DC Comics
Air Fighters Comics (1941 series) #9 - Hillman Periodicals
All-American Comics (1939 series) #50 - DC Comics
All-Star Comics (1940 series) #17 - DC Comics
All-Winners Comics (1941 series) #9 - Timely Comics
Batman (1940 series) #17 - DC Comics
 Captain America Comics (1941 series) #27 - Timely Comics
Detective Comics (1937 series) #76 - DC Comics
Flash Comics (1940 series) #42 - DC Comics
Human Torch Comics (1940 series) #12 - Timely Comics
 Marvel Mystery Comics (1939 series) #44 - Timely Comics
Sensation Comics (1942 series) #18 - DC Comics
Star Spangled Comics (1941 series) #21 - DC Comics
Sub-Mariner Comics (1941 series) #10 - Timely Comics

Summer Issue

 World's Finest Comics (1941 series) #10 - DC Comics

July
 July 4: Jimmy Hatlo's Little Iodine receives her own spin-off comic. It will run until 1985.
 July 18: Kathleen O'Brien's Wanda the War Girl first appears in print.
 July 24: 
 Steve Dowling's Garth makes its debut. It will run until 22 March 1997. 
 Gilbert Lawford Dalton and Jack Glass's Wilson the Wonder Athlete makes its debut. 
 July 26: Bombing of Hanover in World War II: During Allied bombings of the city center of Hanover the Wilhelm Busch Museum is destroyed, but it will be rebuilt after the war.
In Walt Disney's Comics and Stories, Good deeds, by Carl Barks; debut of Neighbor Jones (the character gets his definitive shape four month later, in the story Good Neighbours). 
Action Comics (1938 series) #62 - DC Comics
Air Fighters Comics (1941 series) #10 - Hillman Periodicals
All-American Comics (1939 series) #51 - DC Comics
All-Flash (1941 series) #11, previously quarterly - DC Comics
 Captain America Comics (1941 series) #28 - Timely Comics
Detective Comics (1937 series) #77 - DC Comics
Flash Comics (1940 series) #43 - DC Comics
 Jolly Jingles #10 - MLJ Comics - marks the debut of Al Fagaly's Super Duck.
 Marvel Mystery Comics (1939 series) #45 - Timely Comics
More Fun Comics (1936 series) #92 - DC Comics
Sensation Comics (1942 series) #19 - DC Comics
Star Spangled Comics (1941 series) #22 - DC Comics
Superman (1939 series) #23 - DC Comics
 U.S.A. Comics (1941 series) #9 - Timely Comics
 Wonder Woman (1942 series) #5 - DC Comics: marks the debut of the villain Doctor Psycho.
Young Allies Comics (1941 series) #8 - Timely Comics

August
Action Comics (1938 series) #63 - DC Comics
Adventure Comics (1938 series) #87 - DC Comics
Air Fighters Comics (1941 series) #11 - Hillman Periodicals
All-Star Comics (1940 series) #18 - DC Comics
Batman (1940 series) #18 - DC Comics
Captain America Comics (1941 series) #29 - Timely Comics
Crack Comics (1940 series) #30 - Quality Comics
Detective Comics (1937 series) #78 - DC Comics
Flash Comics (1940 series) #44 - DC Comics
 Marvel Mystery Comics (1939 series) #46 - Timely Comics
Sensation Comics (1942 series) #20 - DC Comics
Star Spangled Comics (1941 series) #23 - DC Comics

September
 September 10: The final episode of the Italian comics magazine Bertoldo is published.
 September 27: In Bob Karp and Al Taliaferro's Donald Duck comic strip Grandma Duck makes her debut as a character (before she had only been seen in a framed picture, on 11 August 1940).
 Action Comics (1938 series) #64, with Toyman vs Superman - DC Comics
Air Fighters Comics (1941 series) #12 - Hillman Periodicals
All-American Comics (1939 series) #52 - DC Comics
All-Winners Comics (1941 series) #10 - Timely Comics
 Captain America Comics (1941 series) #30 - Timely Comics
Detective Comics (1937 series) #79 - DC Comics
Flash Comics (1940 series) #45 - DC Comics
 Marvel Mystery Comics (1939 series) #47 - Timely Comics
More Fun Comics (1936 series) #93 - DC Comics
Sensation Comics (1942 series) #21 - DC Comics
Star Spangled Comics (1941 series) #24 - DC Comics
Sub-Mariner Comics (1941 series) #11 - Timely Comics
Superman (1939 series) #24 - DC Comics
 U.S.A. Comics (1941 series) #10 - Timely Comics
Young Allies Comics (1941 series) #9 - Timely Comics

Fall Issue

 All-Flash (1941 series) #12, previously quarterly - DC Comics
 World's Finest Comics (1941 series) #11 - DC Comics

October
 October 4: Alfred Andriola and Allen Saunders' Kerry Drake makes its debut. It will run until 1983.
 October 17: In an episode of Milton Caniff's Terry and the Pirates Filip Corkin gives a patriotic speech about comradery in the U.S. army. The next day politician John Carl Hinshaw reads it to the Congressional Record. The page becomes a classic and will often be reprinted.
 October 23: Péricles de Andrade Maranhão, aka Péricles, launches the comic strip O Amigo da Onça.
Action Comics (1938 series) #65 - DC Comics
Adventure Comics (1938 series) #88 - DC Comics
Air Fighters Comics (1941 series) #13 - Hillman Periodicals
All-American Comics (1939 series) #53 - DC Comics
All-Star Comics (1940 series) #19 - DC Comics
Batman (1940 series) #19 - DC Comics
 Captain America Comics (1941 series) #31 - Timely Comics
Crack Comics (1940 series) #31 - Quality Comics
Detective Comics (1937 series) #80 - DC Comics
Flash Comics (1940 series) #46 - DC Comics
 Human Torch Comics (1940 series) #13 - Timely Comics
 Marvel Mystery Comics (1939 series) #48 - Timely Comics
Sensation Comics (1942 series) #22 - DC Comics
Star Spangled Comics (1941 series) #25 - DC Comics

November
 November 1: The first episode of Roy Crane's Buz Sawyer is published. It will run until 21 April 1979. 
 The first episode of Albert Chartier's newspaper comic Onésime is published, continuously for 59 years, until 2002.
 The final issue of the Italian comics magazine Giornale dei Ragazzi is published.
Action Comics (1938 series) #66 - DC Comics
Air Fighters Comics (1941 series) #14 - Hillman Periodicals
All-Winners Comics (1941 series) #11 - Timely Comics
 Captain America Comics (1941 series) #32 - Timely Comics
Detective Comics (1937 series) #81 - DC Comics
Flash Comics (1940 series) #47 - DC Comics
 Marvel Mystery Comics (1939 series) #49 - Timely Comics marks the debut of Otto Binder and Al Gabriele's Miss America.
More Fun Comics (1936 series) #94 - DC Comics
Sensation Comics (1942 series) #23 - DC Comics
Star Spangled Comics (1941 series) #26 - DC Comics
Sub-Mariner Comics (1941 series) #12 - Timely Comics
Superman (1939 series) #25 - DC Comics
In Walt Disney’s Comics and stories, Panchito, by Kent Hultgren; debut in comics of Panchito Pistoles.

December
 December 21: In Chester Gould's Dick Tracy the villain Flattop makes his debut.
 December 26: Joseph Hughes Newton's Tullus makes its debut. It will run until 1976.
Action Comics (1938 series) #67 - DC Comics
Adventure Comics (1938 series) #89 - DC Comics
Air Fighters Comics (1941 series) #15 - Hillman Periodicals
All-American Comics (1939 series) #54 - DC Comics
All-Star Comics (1940 series) #20 - DC Comics
Batman (1940 series) #20 - DC Comics
 Captain America Comics (1941 series) #33 - Timely Comics
Crack Comics (1940 series) #32 - Quality Comics
Detective Comics (1937 series) #82 - DC Comics
Flash Comics (1940 series) #48 - DC Comics
 Marvel Mystery Comics (1939 series) #50 - Timely Comics
Sensation Comics (1942 series) #24 - DC Comics
Star Spangled Comics (1941 series) #27 - DC Comics
Young Allies Comics (1941 series) #10 - Timely Comics

Winter Issue

 All-Flash (1941 series) #13, previously quarterly - DC Comics
 World's Finest Comics (1941 series) #12 - DC Comics

Births

January
 January 7: Liz Berube, American comics artist and colorist, known for romance comics, (d. 2021).

Specific date unknown
 Asher Dikstein, Israeli comic artist (The Spaceship of Time, Mysteries of the Lost Continent), (d. 2021).

Deaths

January
 January 28: Eddie Eks, American comics artist, dies at age 60.

March
 March 3: 
 Otto Luihn, Norwegian journalist, poet and comics writer (Sjur Sjursen vil bli kapitalist), dies from heart failure at age 52. 
 Karóly Mühlbeck, Slovakian-Hungarian painter, graphic artist, caricaturist and comics artist (Mühlbeck headlines), dies at age 73.
 March 28: Pete Llanuza, American comics artist (Jack Ofalltrades, continued Joe Jinks), dies at age 70.

April
 April 3: Joe Cunningham, American actor, sports writer and comics artist (Rufus McGoofus), dies at age 52 from coronary disease.
 April 9: Felix Hess, Dutch illustrator, painter, etcher and comics artist (Uit Het Kladschrift van Jantje, De Wonderlijke Reis van Jan Klaassen, De Ongelooflijke Avonturen van Bram Vingerling, Uit Mijn Kladboek), passes away at age 64 in concentration camp Sobibor.
 April 26: Frank Ladendorf, aka Lads, American comics artist (Posey County, Farmer Oatcake, Mischievous Willie, Herr Toughluck Dotty Dimple, The Joys and Sorrows of Mister and Mrs. Newlywed), passes away at age 82.

June
 June 16: Nicholas Afonsky, Russian-American comics artist (continued Minute Movies, Little Annie Rooney and Secret Agent X-9), dies at age 51.

July
 July 8: Jean Moulin, French resistance fighter and cartoonist, dies at age 44, after being captured by the Gestapo.

September
 September 14: John R. Neill, American illustrator and comics artist (Life Among the Macaronis, The Fate of a Crown, Children's Stories That Never Grow Old, The Little Journeys of Nip and Tuck), dies at age 65.

October
 October 10: Charlotte Salomon, German painter and comics artist (Leben? oder Theater?: Ein Singspiel), is gassed to death in Auschwitz at age 26.  
 October 18: A.M. de Jong, Dutch novelist and comics writer (Bulletje en Boonestaak) is murdered by two SS soldiers in his own home, at age 55.

December
 December 29: Enrico Novelli, aka Yambo, Italian journalist, writer, illustrator and comics artist, dies at age 69.

Specific date unknown
 Herbert Sydney Foxwell, British comics artist ( continued The Bruin Boys (better known as Tiger Tim) and Teddy Tail, created The Bunty Boys), dies at age 52 or 53.
 Worden Wood, American comics artist (ghostdrew Buster Brown), passes away at age 62 or 63.

First issues by title
Kid Komics
Released: February by Timely Comics, featuring Captain Wonder and Tim Mulrooney

Initial appearances by character name
Alfred Beagle in Batman #18 (April), created by Bob Kane, Bill Finger and Jerry Robinson - DC Comics
Henry King in All Star Comics #15 (February), created by Gardner Fox and Joe Gallagher - DC Comics
Captain Triumph in Crack Comics #27 (January), Created by Alfred Andriola - DC Comics
Cavalier (comics) in Detective Comics #81 (November), created by Don Cameron and Bob Kane - DC Comics
Cheetah (comics) in Wonder Woman #06 (Fall Issue), William Moulton Marston - DC Comics 
Crime Doctor (comics) in Detective Comics #77 (July), created by Bill Finger and Bob Kane - DC Comics
Doctor Psycho in Wonder Woman #5 (July), created by William Moulton Marston and Harry G. Peter - DC Comics
King Bee in All-Star Comics #18 (August), created by Gardner Fox - DC Comics 
Sabbac in Captain Marvel Jr. #4 (July), created by Otto Binder and Al Carreno - DC Comics
Thinker (DC Comics) in All Flash #12 (September), created by Gardner Fox and E.E. Hibbard - DC Comics
Toyman in Action Comics #64 (September), created by Don Cameron and Ed Dobrotka - DC Comics
Tweedledum and Tweedledee (comics) in Detective Comics #74 (April), created by Bob Kane, Don Cameron and Jerry Robinson - DC Comics
Uncle Marvel in Wow Comics #18 (October), created by Otto Binder and Marc Swayze - DC Comics
Vandal Savage in Green Lantern #10 (December), created by Alfred Bester and Martin Nodell - DC Comics

References